Benjamin Peter Sherrington Shephard (born 11 December 1974) is an English television presenter and journalist who is currently employed by ITV. He was a main presenter on the now defunct breakfast programme GMTV and since April 2014 has co-hosted the ITV breakfast show Good Morning Britain alongside Susanna Reid, Kate Garraway and Charlotte Hawkins. He has also hosted game shows such as The Krypton Factor (2009–2010), Tipping Point (2012–present) and Ninja Warrior UK (2015–present). 

In 2012, along with Helen Skelton, he welcomed the athletes of the London 2012 Olympic and Paralympic Games to Trafalgar Square as part of their homecoming parade.

Early life and education
Shephard was educated at Chigwell School, an independent school in the civil parish of Chigwell in the Epping Forest area of Essex, followed by the University of Birmingham, where he achieved a BA honours degree in Dance, Drama and Theatre Arts. Initially wanting to become an actor, while at university he joined a local weather network through a casting process and then became a runner (the most junior member of a television crew), before being encouraged to become a television presenter by a producer.

Career

Channel 4

Shephard's career took off in 1998, when he began hosting Channel 4 spin-off show The Bigger Breakfast, alongside fellow presenters including Josie D'Arby, Melanie Sykes and Dermot O'Leary. That same year, Shephard became the first presenter of T4's teen strand on Channel 4, which launched on 25 October 1998. He also presented Control Freaks for the channel in 1998.

Shephard returned to Channel 4 in 2013 to co-present cookery programme called What's Cooking?. He hosted one series, alongside Lisa Faulkner, and then permanently left Channel 4 on 24 May 2013.

ITV

Between 2004 and 2006, Shephard presented the first three series of ITV2 spin-off programme The Xtra Factor, whilst Kate Thornton hosted the main show on ITV  While hosting the show, Shephard also starred in The Xtra Factor – Battle of the Stars. He left the show after three series after missing out on the main presenting role (which went to Dermot O'Leary after the departure of original host Kate Thornton); he was replaced by Fearne Cotton.

Between 2005 and 2011, Shephard was a stand-in presenter on  This Morning, covering for regular presenter Phillip Schofield. In 2014, Ben was a stand-in presenter on This Morning Summer, co-hosting one episode alongside Ruth Langsford. Since 2015, he has been a regular stand-in presenter for Schofield and Eamonn Holmes.

In 2006, Shephard co-presented reality singing contest Soapstar Superstar alongside Fern Britton. The programme returned the following year in 2007, without Shephard as the host. In 2007, Shephard co-hosted Dancing on Ice Exclusive, a spin-off series which aired on ITV.

In 2008, Shephard co-presented Who Dares, Sings! with Denise van Outen.

Shephard has hosted numerous music specials on the channel, celebrating some of Britain's best-loved musicians. These shows were Rod Stewart: One Night Only, which aired on 5 December 2009 and Phil Collins: One Night Only, which aired the following year on 18 September 2010.

In 2009, ITV revived the classic game show The Krypton Factor, with Shephard chosen to present the new series. Following the success of the first series in 2009, he was asked to present a second series the following year. In 2010, Shephard co-presented a short-lived show called Dancing on Ice Friday alongside Coleen Nolan. The show was a spin-off from the main Dancing on Ice show.

Shephard has presented the popular daytime game show Tipping Point since 2012, as well as celebrity episodes known as Tipping Point: Lucky Stars since 2013. In June 2015, it was announced that Tipping Point had been renewed for two further series to air in 2016 and 2017.

Shephard co-presented two episodes of the factual series Mystery Map with Julia Bradbury, which aired for two episodes on 20 November 2013 and 27 November 2013 respectively.

Since 2015, Ben has co-presented the Saturday night game show Ninja Warrior UK for ITV. He presents the show alongside Rochelle Humes and Chris Kamara. The first series began airing on 11 April 2015 and a second series began on 2 January 2016. A third series of Ninja Warrior UK began on 31 December 2016.

ITV Breakfast

Shephard joined the long-running programme GMTV in 2000 where he presented Entertainment Today alongside Jenni Falconer. He also became the main relief presenter for GMTV Today. Due to the departure of Eamonn Holmes in April 2005, Shephard became Fiona Phillips' co-host on GMTV Today, presenting on Mondays, Tuesdays and alternate Wednesdays. He continued to present Entertainment Today, but began to share duties with Michael Underwood. When GMTV relaunched in January 2009, his main co-host became Kate Garraway, presenting on Monday, Tuesday and alternate Wednesdays.

On 30 June 2010, Shephard announced his departure from GMTV, two months before the end of the programme, stating that he wished to spend more time with his family and focus on his charity work. Ben presented his final episode of GMTV on 30 July 2010, before the programme was axed two months later in September. The show was later replaced by Daybreak hosted Adrian Chiles and Christine Bleakley and then later by Lorraine Kelly, Kate Garraway and Aled Jones.

After just four years on air, Daybreak was axed in spring 2014 to make way for a brand new ITV Breakfast programme Good Morning Britain. It was announced on 3 March 2014, that Shephard would be a presenter on the newly launched programme. Shephard's first show was on 28 April 2014 and he currently hosts the show on Thursdays and Fridays alongside Susanna Reid (Thursday) and Kate Garraway (Friday).

Starting 29 October 2019, Shephard will host Rugby X on ITV4.

Sky

On 27 July 2010, Shephard announced that he had signed a new contract with Sky Sports, where he presented Goals on Sunday alongside Chris Kamara in a deal reportedly worth £495,000 a year. He also hosted live secondary match coverage of the UEFA Champions League on Sky Sports 3 or 4, while the main coverage on Sky Sports 1 is hosted by Jeff Stelling. He was the main anchor for Sky Sports coverage of the League Cup. As of April 2014, Shephard only presented Goals on Sunday for Sky Sports and no longer hosted any of the live matches.

In 2011, Shephard fronted an eight-part game show for Sky1 called Safebreakers.

As of 28 June 2019, Shephard quit Goals on Sunday in order to spend time with his family.

BBC

In the earlier 2000s, Shephard was a regular presenter of BBC Choice's EastEnders Revealed program. In 2007, Shephard presented the BBC entertainment series DanceX with Strictly Come Dancing judges Arlene Phillips and Bruno Tonioli on the panel.

Between 2008 and 2009, Shephard presented the National Lottery game show 1 vs. 100, taking over from Dermot O'Leary.

In June 2012, Shephard made a guest appearance on the sports-based panel show A Question Of Sport. The following month he announced that he had permanently left the BBC in order to concentrate on his work with Sky Sports and ITV.

Radio
In 2006, Shephard was a presenter on Magic Radio station. He presented a Saturday breakfast programme. He returned to radio in 2008, where he presented a Monday evening show on Heat Radio.

Other work
Shephard appeared in the 2004 TV film A Bear's Christmas Tail as a carol singer. He also appeared in Harry Potter and the Half-Blood Prince in 2009. He played the role of Diagon Alley Father, but was uncredited. In 2009, Shephard starred in an episode of Bookaboo on CITV. In 2012, he was a studio host for the London 2012 Olympic Games, and Paralympic Games, which was only made available to view in the Olympic park. At this time, he also acted as a stadium commentator, where he introduced all of the action in the main arena, and he also interviewed celebrity guests.

In 2013, Shephard was the face of Warburtons lunch thins. He has been on the judging panel for Pride of Britain Awards numerous times.

Shephard holds a Guinness World Record. In 2010, he set the record for smashing the most pumpkins in one minute. In 2008 he held the record for the Highest reverse bungee jump which was beaten in 2010 by David Hasselhoff; and he held the record for tossing the most pancakes in one minute in 2009, but was beaten the following day by Aldo Zilli.

Personal life
Shephard married Annie Perks on 25 March 2004, and the couple have two sons. The couple met when they were both students at the University of Birmingham, where Perks studied Philosophy and was Head of the Philosophy & Epistemology society. 

A West Ham United supporter, Shephard has also received honours in both rugby and football.

Charity
Shephard supports several charities including the Cystic Fibrosis Trust, Haven House Children's Hospice and the Holly Lodge Centre. To help raise funds for these charities, Shephard takes part in various physical challenges. Since the year 2000, he has completed 14 marathons.

In 2006, 2008, 2010, 2012, 2014, 2016, and 2019, Shephard played for England in Soccer Aid which aired live on ITV. The Soccer Aid events raise money for the Unicef charity.  In 2016 he was red carded for a "cynical foul" on Dimitar Berbatov. Shephard did not take part in 2018's Soccer Aid due to an injury. Instead, he was appointed as England Coach for that year's Soccer Aid. Shephard did not take part in 2020's Soccer Aid.

One of Shephard's charity challenges was boxing against Lemar for the Sport Relief appeal. After training with Ricky Hatton and Andy Mayo at Mayo's Gym, he won by decision after three rounds.

Another of Shephard's charity challenges took place in early 2009 when he, along with eight other well-known celebrities, climbed Mount Kilimanjaro to raise money for Comic Relief. Joining him on the climb were Cheryl Cole, Kimberley Walsh, Fearne Cotton, Gary Barlow, Alesha Dixon, Ronan Keating, Denise van Outen and Chris Moyles. The team raised £3,326,000 in total.

In 2010, Shephard and his friend Ivan ran the Coast-to-Coast Challenge, raising over £120,000 for the Children's Heart Unit Fund at the Freeman Hospital in Newcastle upon Tyne. The run was 145 miles long and took them five days.

In March 2011, Shephard designed blue and black striped hipsters for charity to help raise awareness of Prostate Cancer.

In January 2014, Shephard helped to raise money for the charity Seb4Chuf.

In September 2017, he played as part of Les Ferdinand's team for Game 4 Grenfell.

Filmography

Television

Film

Radio

Book
 Humble Heroes: Inspirational stories of hope, heart and humanity (Blink Publishing, 2022)

References

External links
Official website

Ben Shephard at Sky Sports

1974 births
Alumni of the University of Birmingham
English game show hosts
English television presenters
GMTV presenters and reporters
ITV Breakfast presenters and reporters
Living people
People educated at Chigwell School
People from Epping
Sky Sports presenters and reporters
Television personalities from Essex